The Sidewinders is a Barbershop quartet that won the 1964 SPEBSQSA international competition.

Discography 
 Here's Barbershop (1963; LP)
 Sidewinders (1964; LP)
 Sunrise-Sunset (LP)
 Re-Released (double-LP compilation)

References

Barbershop quartets
Barbershop Harmony Society